Yone Moriyama (14 January 1891 – 30 October 1990) was a Japanese educator and politician. She was one of the first group of women elected to the House of Representatives in 1946.

Biography
Moriyama was born in Kurume in 1891. She then studied at Columbia University in the United States as an overseas researcher for the Ministry of Education. After retiring, she moved to Brazil, but returned to Japan in 1942.

Moriyama contested the 1946 general elections (the first in which women could vote) as a Japan Progressive Party candidate, and was elected to the House of Representatives. She did not run for re-election in 1947 general elections and withdrew from public life. She lived with her niece for the rest of her life and died in 1990.

References

1891 births
People from Kurume
Columbia University alumni
Japanese schoolteachers
Academic staff of Fukuoka Women's University
Japanese expatriates in Brazil
20th-century Japanese women politicians
20th-century Japanese politicians
Japan Progressive Party politicians
Members of the House of Representatives (Japan)
1990 deaths